Stibbard is a surname. Notable people with the surname include:

Neville Stibbard (1923–1994), Australian rules footballer
Neville Stibbard (born 1952), Australian rules footballer
Robert Stibbard (born 1952), Australian rules footballer